Kuluncak is a town and district of Malatya Province in the Eastern Anatolia region of Turkey. The mayor is Mehmet Boyraz (AKP).

References

External links
  District governor's official website

Populated places in Malatya Province
Districts of Malatya Province